The Willard Historic District, is a historic district in Willard, Utah, United States, that is listed on the National Register of Historic Places (NRHP).

Description  

It includes a school built in 1902, and work by builder Shadrach Jones, and some houses combining elements of Greek Revival and Gothic Revival style.

It was later renamed Willard for Willard Richards, a Mormon apostle. One home in the district, the Lyman Wells House, was built in the early 1850s. The village was laid out largely in conformance to Mormon plans for a City of Zion.

The district was listed on the NRHP June 25, 1974.

See also

 National Register of Historic Places listings in Box Elder County, Utah

References

External links

National Register of Historic Places in Box Elder County, Utah
Greek Revival architecture in Utah
Gothic Revival architecture in Utah
Buildings and structures completed in 1851